Bernhard Stade (May 1848, Arnstadt, Thuringia6 December 1906) was a German Protestant theologian and historian.

Biography
He studied at Leipzig and Berlin, and in course of time became (1875) professor ordinarius at Giessen. Once a member of Franz Delitzsch's class, he became a convinced adherent of the newest critical school. In 1881 he founded the Zeitschrift für die alttestamentliche Wissenschaft, which he continued to edit; and his critical history of Israel (Geschichte des Volks Israel, 2 vols., 1887–1888; vol. ii in conjunction with Oskar Holtzmann) made him very widely known.

With Carl Siegfried, he revised and edited the Hebrew lexicon, Hebräisches Wörterbuch zum Alten Testament (1892–1893). Stade's other works included:
Über die alttestamentlichen Vorstellungen vom Zustand nach dem Tode (1877).
Lehrbuch der hebräischen Grammatik (vol. i, 1879).
Ausgewählte akademische Reden und Abhandlungen (1899).
Biblische Theologie des Alten Testaments (1905, etc.).

References

Further reading 
 Hans-Joachim Kraus: Geschichte der historisch-kritischen Erforschung des Alten Testaments von der Reformation bis zur Gegenwart. (1956) 3. erw. Aufl. Neukirchener Verl., Neukirchen-Vluyn 1982, S. 283-288. 
"Stade Bernhard", Jewish Encyclopedia

1848 births
1906 deaths
19th-century German Protestant theologians
People from Schwarzburg-Sondershausen
19th-century German male writers
German male non-fiction writers